The tenth season of the One Piece anime series, the "Thriller Bark Chapter", was produced by Toei Animation, and directed by Munehisa Sakai based on Eiichiro Oda's manga by the same name. It deals with the meeting and recruitment of Brook in a mysterious mist. There, the crew comes across Thriller Bark captained by Gecko Moria, one of the Seven Warlords of the Sea who uses shadows to create a crew of zombies.

The season began airing on Fuji Television on January 6 and ended on December 14, 2008, lasting 45 episodes. Thirteen compilations of the season has been released so far as of July 7, 2010 The first DVD release for the season was released on October 7, 2009.

The season uses two pieces of theme music. The first opening theme, titled "Jungle P", is performed by 5050.

The Funimation English dub of the first 12 episodes were originally going to be release in May 2014, but was delayed until September to coincide with the release of the Funimation dub of One Piece Film: Z.



Episode list

Home releases

Japanese

English
In North America, the season was recategorized as the majority of "Season Six" for its DVD release by Funimation Entertainment. The Australian Season Six sets were renamed Collection 29 though 32.

References

2008 Japanese television seasons
One Piece seasons
One Piece episodes